Alan J. Lipman is an American clinical psychologist and musician. He is in practice in Washington, D.C., studying causes of violence in adults and youth, mass and school shootings, murder and homicide, a professor of psychiatry and behavioral sciences at the George Washington University Medical Center, the director of the Center for the Study of Violence, and an expert for news organizations such as the Washington Post. Lipman is also a commentator on the areas of violence, mass and school shootings, homicide, terrorism, psychology and psychotherapy, having served as commentator for CNN, NBC News, MSNBC, CBS News, ABC News, Fox, NHK and the CBC since 1998,. Lipman holds the M.A. and Ph.D. degrees in Clinical Psychology from Temple University as well as Juris Doctor from Georgetown University Law Center. As a musician, he performs credited as X-Patriate.

Career
Lipman has served as a professor at Georgetown University, The George Washington University, and Rutgers University, and has also held positions at The Hospital of the University of Pennsylvania and Yale Psychiatric Institute.  At Georgetown, he founded the Center for the Study of Violence as well as the Georgetown Youth Violence Summit.  Lipman also served as co-chairman of the Academic Advisory Council of the White House Campaign Against Youth Violence, initiated at a White House summit during the Clinton Administration.  He has also served as a consultant on the effects of September 11, 2001 to the U.S. Department of Health and Human Services and to the U.S. Department of State and is an Invited Member of the United Kingdom Peer Review College of the Economic and Social Research Council and an Invited Member of the editorial board of the scholarly journal Violence and Gender. He lectures both nationally and internationally on the subjects of violence, crime, terrorism, and their causes, after-effects, and prevention. He also writes on the psychology of Presidents, including Donald Trump.

In the media

Commentator
Lipman has appeared on MSNBC, CNN, CNN Headline News, NBC Evening News, CBS, ABC News, Court TV, and the BBC.

Lipman also has an additional career as a composer, vocalist/multi-instrumentalist and recording artist.

References

External links

Center for the Study of Violence

Year of birth missing (living people)
Living people
21st-century American psychologists
University of Connecticut alumni
Temple University alumni
Georgetown University Law Center alumni
University of Pennsylvania staff
Georgetown University faculty
People associated with the September 11 attacks